Niklaus Schilling (23 April 1944 – 6 May 2016) was a Swiss film director, cinematographer, and screenwriter. He directed 13 films between 1967 and 1996. His 1977 film The Expulsion from Paradise was entered into the 27th Berlin International Film Festival. The following year, his film Rhinegold was entered into the 28th Berlin International Film Festival.

Selected filmography
 Forty Eight Hours to Acapulco (dir. , 1967)
 Detectives (dir. Rudolf Thome, 1969)
 Don't Fumble, Darling (dir. , 1970)
  (1972)
 The Expulsion from Paradise (1977)
 Rhinegold (1978)
 The Willi Busch Report (1979)
  (1982)
  (1984)
 Dormire (1985)
 The Spirit (1989)
  (1992)

References

External links

1944 births
2016 deaths
German-language film directors
Swiss film directors
Swiss cinematographers
Swiss screenwriters
Male screenwriters